Wheeleria leptopsamma is a moth of the family Pterophoridae that is endemic to Egypt. It was described by Edward Meyrick in 1925.

References

Moths described in 1925
Pterophorini
Endemic fauna of Egypt
Moths of Africa